Galashiels is a railway station on the Borders Railway, which runs between  and . It is owned by Network Rail and managed by ScotRail.

History
The station was opened on 20 February 1849 by the Edinburgh and Hawick Railway, which later became known as the Waverley Route. The line was nicknamed after the popular Waverley Novels, written by Sir Walter Scott.

The station, along with the line, was closed by British Rail on 5 January 1969.

The current station is located slightly to the north of the original.

Services

As of the May 2021 timetable change, the station is served by an hourly service between Edinburgh Waverley and Tweedbank, with a half-hourly service operating at peak times (Monday to Saturday). Some peak time trains continue to Glenrothes with Thornton. All services are operated by ScotRail.

Rolling stock used: Class 158 Express Sprinter and Class 170 Turbostar

References

Sources

External links
 
 

Railway stations in the Scottish Borders
Former North British Railway stations
Railway stations in Great Britain opened in 1849
Railway stations in Great Britain closed in 1969
Beeching closures in Scotland
Railway stations in Great Britain opened in 2015
Borders Railway
Railway stations served by ScotRail
Reopened railway stations in Great Britain
1849 establishments in Scotland
1969 disestablishments in Scotland
2015 establishments in Scotland
Galashiels